Entomoantyx cyanipennis is a species of beetle in the family Carabidae, the only species in the genus Entomoantyx.

References

Paussinae